The 2000 Ohio Bobcats football team represented Ohio University during the 2000 NCAA Division I-A football season. Ohio competed as a member of the Mid-American Conference (MAC). The Bobcats were led by head coach Jim Grobe, who resigned after the conclusion of the season to become the head coach for Wake Forest.  They played their home games in Peden Stadium in Athens, Ohio.

Schedule

References

Ohio
Ohio Bobcats football seasons
Ohio Bobcats football